Greenlee County is a county in the southeastern part of the U.S. state of Arizona. As of the 2020 census, the population was 9,563, making it Arizona's least populous county. The county seat is Clifton.

The economy of Greenlee County is dominated by the Morenci Mine, the largest copper mining operation in North America, and one of the largest copper mines in the world. , the mine complex, owned by Freeport-McMoRan, had about 3,300 employees.

History
Greenlee County was created in 1909 and named for Mason Greenlee who was an early settler in the Clifton area. It was Arizona's 14th county and formed from part of Graham County, which opposed the formation because Graham County would lose considerable revenue. Clifton has always been the county seat.

Geography
It is the second-smallest county by area in Arizona.

Adjacent counties
 Cochise County – south
 Graham County – west
 Apache County – north
 Catron County, New Mexico – east
 Grant County, New Mexico – east
 Hidalgo County, New Mexico – southeast

National protected areas
 Apache-Sitgreaves National Forest (part)
 Gila Box Riparian National Conservation Area (part)

Major highways
  U.S. Route 70
  U.S. Route 191
  State Route 75
  State Route 78

Demographics

2000 census
As of the census of 2000, there were 8,547 people, 3,117 households, and 2,266 families living in the county.  The population density was 5 people per square mile (2/km2).  There were 3,744 housing units at an average density of 2 per square mile (1/km2).  The racial makeup of the county was 74.2% White, 0.5% Black or African American, 1.7% Native American, 0.2% Asian, <0.1% Pacific Islander, 20.0% from other races, and 3.5% from two or more races.  43.1% of the population were Hispanic or Latino of any race. 25.2% reported speaking Spanish at home.

There were 3,117 households, out of which 39.2% had children under the age of 18 living with them, 58.3% were married couples living together, 9.0% had a female householder with no husband present, and 27.3% were non-families. 24.5% of all households were made up of individuals, and 7.3% had someone living alone who was 65 years of age or older.  The average household size was 2.73 and the average family size was 3.26.

In the county, the population was spread out, with 31.7% under the age of 18, 7.5% from 18 to 24, 28.2% from 25 to 44, 22.6% from 45 to 64, and 9.9% who were 65 years of age or older.  The median age was 34 years. For every 100 females, there were 109.2 males.  For every 100 females age 18 and over, there were 108.0 males.

The median income for a household in the county was $39,384, and the median income for a family was $43,523. Males had a median income of $38,952 versus $23,333 for females. The per capita income for the county was $15,814.  About 8.0% of families and 9.9% of the population were below the poverty line, including 11.1% of those under age 18 and 8.7% of those age 65 or over.

2010 census
As of the census of 2010, there were 8,437 people, 3,188 households, and 2,152 families living in the county. The racial makeup of the county was 77.2% white, 2.3% American Indian, 1.1% black or African American, 0.5% Asian, 0.1% Pacific islander, 15.0% from other races, and 3.8% from two or more races. Those of Hispanic or Latino origin made up 47.9% of the population. In terms of ancestry, 12.9% were English, 12.1% were German, 10.6% were Irish, and 1.6% were American.

Of the 3,188 households, 37.5% had children under the age of 18 living with them, 49.5% were married couples living together, 9.6% had a female householder with no husband present, 32.5% were non-families, and 27.8% of all households were made up of individuals. The average household size was 2.64 and the average family size was 3.21. The median age was 34.8 years.

The median income for a household in the county was $48,696 and the median income for a family was $51,729. Males had a median income of $50,446 versus $34,171 for females. The per capita income for the county was $21,281. About 9.4% of families and 13.5% of the population were below the poverty line, including 17.8% of those under age 18 and 13.2% of those age 65 or over.

Politics
Greenlee County used to be the most reliably Democratic county in Arizona, owing to the presence of the copper mining industry. As the county was heavily unionized and the Democratic Party was generally the party of organized labor, Greenlee County voted for the Democratic nominee in every presidential election from the state's admission to the Union in 1912 to 1996, being one of only seven Mountain State counties to support George McGovern in his landslide defeat against Republican Richard Nixon in the Election of 1972. Even Ronald Reagan was unable to win it in his 49 state landslide in 1984. However, in 2000, George W. Bush became the first Republican presidential candidate to win the county, and it has voted for the Republican nominee in the five elections since, giving Donald Trump 66% of the vote in 2020. The county's turn to the GOP can likely be explained by the Democratic Party's modern platform of environmentalism that has been perceived as anti-mining (for example, Bush's 2000 opponent, Al Gore, was staunchly against coal mining).

The county is located in Arizona's 6th congressional district, which has a Cook Partisan Voting Index of R+3 and is represented by Republican Congressman Juan Ciscomani. In the Arizona House of Representatives it is represented by Republican Becky Nutt and Republican Drew John. In the Arizona Senate it is represented by Republican Gail Griffin.

Communities

Towns
 Clifton (county seat)
 Duncan

Census-designated places
 Franklin
 Morenci
 York

Unincorporated communities
 Blue
 Apache Grove
 Hannagan Meadows
 Three Way
 Sheldon
 Verde Lee-Loma Linda

Other locations
 Strayhorse, a location along Route 191 in the vicinity of Strayhorse creek/canyon/campground

Ghost Towns 

Boyles
 Guthrie
 Metcalf
 Oroville

County population ranking
The population ranking of the following table is based on the 2010 census of Greenlee County.

† county seat

Education
School districts include:
 Blue Elementary School District
 Duncan Unified School District
 Eagle Elementary District
 Morenci Unified School District

See also

 National Register of Historic Places listings in Greenlee County, Arizona

References

Notes

External links
 County website

 
Populated places established in 1873
1909 establishments in Arizona Territory
Safford, Arizona micropolitan area